Norris Arm is a town in north-central Newfoundland, Newfoundland and Labrador, Canada. It is in Division No. 6, on the Bay of Exploits.

Demographics 

Climate

See also
 List of cities and towns in Newfoundland and Labrador

References

External links
 Flying Boat Festival International
Norris Arm - Encyclopedia of Newfoundland and Labrador, vol. 4, p. 97-98.

Populated coastal places in Canada
Towns in Newfoundland and Labrador